van der Vorst is a Dutch surname. Notable people with the surname include:

Henk van der Vorst (born 1944), Dutch mathematician
Monique van der Vorst (born 1984), Dutch cyclist
Patrick van der Vorst (born 1971), entrepreneur

Dutch-language surnames
Surnames of Dutch origin